The Heat's On (1943) is a musical movie starring Mae West, William Gaxton, and Victor Moore, and released by Columbia Pictures.

Plot
Broadway star Fay Lawrence (West) is a temperamental diva who is reluctantly persuaded by a Broadway producer (Gaxton) to star in his latest production.

Cast
 Mae West ...  Fay Lawrence
 Victor Moore ...  Hubert Bainbridge
 William Gaxton ...  Tony Ferris
 Lester Allen ...  Mouse Beller
 Alan Dinehart ...  Forrest Stanton
 Mary Roche ...  Janey Adair
 Lloyd Bridges ...  Andy Walker
 Almira Sessions ...  Hannah Bainbridge
 Jack Owens ...  Himself
 Hazel Scott ...  Herself
 Xavier Cugat and His Orchestra ...  Themselves

Production background
Mae West was 49 at the time of the movie's production, her first film in three years, after an interlude starring on Broadway. Unlike her previous films, for which West wrote the screenplays and/or story material, West played no part in creating the story or dialogue of The Heat's On.  Perhaps as a result, the movie was not a box office success.  West did not return to the screen until 27 years later in Myra Breckenridge (1970), and chose to pursue a successful career in theater instead.

References

External links
 
 
 

1943 films
1940s musical drama films
American black-and-white films
Columbia Pictures films
Films directed by Gregory Ratoff
American musical drama films
1943 drama films
1940s English-language films
1940s American films